Alexandra Danielle Ainsworth (born October 28, 1992) is an Emmy Award-winning American actress.  She is recognized for her roles as Kristina Davis on General Hospital, Amber from Shameless, and Jessica Burns in the 2015 film A Girl Like Her.

Early life
Ainsworth was born in Oklahoma City, Oklahoma. She began dancing on stage at the local ballet company at age six. This led her to appear in several theater productions, such as The Wizard of Oz (as a munchkin) and To Kill A Mockingbird (as Scout).

Ainsworth was mostly home-schooled.

Career
After attending acting camps in New York City and Los Angeles, Ainsworth landed her first major commercial, for Barbie dolls, which aired nationally. After several more commercials, she appeared in the lead role in the short film Caroline Crossing, and then portrayed murder victim Grace Budd in the 2007 film The Gray Man.

In June 2009, she joined the cast of General Hospital as Kristina Davis, for which she was nominated for a Daytime Emmy in 2011; Ainsworth returned to the role in 2015.

In 2015 Ainsworth also played Jessica Burns, a high schooler driven to the point of suicide by bullying, in the found-footage film A Girl Like Her.

In 2017, Ainsworth won a Daytime Emmy Award for Outstanding Younger Actress in a Drama Series for her role as Kristina Davis on General Hospital.

Filmography

Film

Television

Awards and nominations

References

External links

 
 Lexi Ainsworth on General Hospital abuse storyline, soaps.com; accessed June 28, 2017.

1992 births
American child actresses
American soap opera actresses
American television actresses
Living people
Actresses from Oklahoma City
21st-century American actresses
American stage actresses
American ballerinas
Daytime Emmy Award winners
Daytime Emmy Award for Outstanding Younger Actress in a Drama Series winners